Horsepen is an unincorporated community in Tazewell County, Virginia, United States. Horsepen has a post office with ZIP code 24619.

Horsepen was first settled by Cherokee people who raided white settlers in the region; they used a natural pen in the area to hold captured horses, giving the community its name. The Horsepen post office was originally in West Virginia but was later moved to the Virginia side of the border.

References

Unincorporated communities in Tazewell County, Virginia
Unincorporated communities in Virginia